Dragon's Lair III: The Curse of Mordread is a video game in the Dragon's Lair series, developed by Don Bluth Multimedia and published by ReadySoft Incorporated for the Amiga, Atari ST and MS-DOS in 1993. An Apple IIGS port was released in 2022.

It mixed original footage with scenes from Dragon's Lair II: Time Warp that were not included in the original PC release due to memory constraints. The game also included a newly produced "Blackbeard the Pirate" stage that was originally intended to be in the arcade game but was never completed.

Plot 

The wizard Mordroc's witch sister Mordread seeks revenge for her brother's death and captures Dirk the Daring's homestead into an orb on her staff. Dirk was not in the house, so he begins pursuing Mordread to restore his home, and Princess Daphne inside it.

Two levels also in Dragon's Lair II ("Dirk in Wonderland" and "Beethoven's Creative Gust") are featured, in addition to said game's lost and unfinished "Blackbeard the Pirate", and the final stage is an original one: "Father Time's Castle".

References

External links 
 Dragon's Lair III: The Curse of Mordread at MobyGames
 

1993 video games
Amiga games
Atari ST games
DOS games
Dragon's Lair
Full motion video based games
ReadySoft Incorporated games
Single-player video games
Video games about time travel
Video game sequels
Video games developed in the United States
Video games about witchcraft